Narrative structure is a literary element generally described as the structural framework that underlies the order and manner in which a narrative is presented to a reader, listener, or viewer. The narrative text structures are the plot and the setting.

Definition 
Narrative structure is about story and plot: the content of a story and the form used to tell the story. Story refers to the dramatic action as it might be described in chronological order. Plot refers to how the story is told. Story is about trying to determine the key conflicts, main characters, setting and events. Plot is about how, and at what stages, the key conflicts are set up and resolved.

Variations

Three-act structure 

The three-act structure is a common structure in classical film and other narrative forms in or associated with the West.

The first act begins with setup, where all of the main characters and their basic situations are introduced, as well as the setting, and contains the primary level of characterization for both (exploring the character's backgrounds and personalities, the relationships between them, and the dynamics of the world they live in). 

Later in the first act, a dynamic event occurs known as the inciting incident (or catalyst), that involves the protagonist. His or her initial attempts to deal with this event lead to the first plot point, where the first act ends and a dramatic question is raised; for example, "Will X disable the bomb?" or "Will Y get the girl?"

The second act, or confrontation, is considered by this structure to be the bulk of the story. This is the part of the story where the characters' conflict is most developed (particularly between the protagonist and antagonist) as well as any changes in values and personality one or more characters may undergo (known as character development, or a character arc). This leads to the second plot point, where the second act ends and the protagonist returns to his or her ordinary world.

The third act, or resolution, is when the problem in the story boils over, forcing the characters to confront it, allowing all the elements of the story to come together, leading to the climax, the answer to the dramatic question, and the end of the conflict.

Kishōtenketsu 

Kishōtenketsu is a structure mainly found in classic Chinese, Korean, and Japanese narratives.

Kishōtenketsu is divided up into four sections, which have been defined and used differently by narratives from each of the three cultures where the form is most commonly found. The first section is generally considered an introduction of sorts across all three interpretations, albeit understood by each in a different way. The second may refer to the development, or to a beginning of an action related to self-realization. The third section is based around a turning point, change in direction, reversal, or twist. The fourth and final section concerns itself with a result or conclusion, a consequence thereof, or a 'coming to fruition'.

History 
First described in ancient times by Greek philosophers (such as Aristotle and Plato), the notion of narrative structure saw renewed popularity as a critical concept in the mid-to-late-20th century, when structuralist literary theorists including Roland Barthes, Vladimir Propp, Joseph Campbell, and Northrop Frye attempted to argue that all human narratives have certain universal, deep structural elements in common. This argument fell out of fashion when advocates of poststructuralism such as Michel Foucault and Jacques Derrida asserted that such universally shared, deep structures were logically impossible.

In Northrop Frye's Anatomy of Criticism, he deals extensively with what he calls myths of spring, summer, fall, and winter:

 Spring myths are comedies, that is, stories that lead from bad situations to happy endings.  Shakespeare's Twelfth Night is such a story.
 Summer myths are similarly utopian fantasies such as Dante's Paradiso.
 Fall myths are tragedies that lead from ideal situations to disaster. Compare Hamlet, Othello, and King Lear and the movie Legends of the Fall.
 Winter myths are dystopias; for example, George Orwell's 1984, Aldous Huxley's Brave New World, and Ayn Rand's novella Anthem.

In Frye’s Great Code, he offers two narrative structures for plots:
 A U-shaped structure, that is, a story that begins with a state of equilibrium that descends to disaster and then upward to a new stable condition. This is the shape of a comedy.
 An inverted U-shape structure, that is, a story in which the protagonist rises to prominence and descends to disaster. This is the shape of tragedy.

Categories 
Most forms of narrative fall under four main categories: linear narrative, nonlinear narrative, interactive narration, and interactive narrative. 
Linear narrative is the most common form of narration, where events are largely portrayed in a chronological order telling the events in the order in which they occurred.
Nonlinear narrative, disjointed narrative, or disrupted narrative is a narrative technique where events are portrayed out of chronological order or in other ways where the narrative does not follow the direct causality pattern.
Interactive narration refers to a work where the linear narrative is driven by, rather than influenced by, the user's interaction.
Interactive narrative is a form of fiction in which users are able to make choices that influence the narrative (for example, through alternative plots or resulting in alternative endings) through their actions.

Linear narrative 
Flashbacks, often confused with true narratives, are not linear but the concept is fundamentally linear. An example would be Citizen Kane by Orson Welles. Although some films appear to open (very briefly) with the ending, flashback movies almost immediately jump back to the very beginning of the story to proceed linearly from there. Usually the film will proceed past the supposed "ending" shown at the beginning of the movie.

Nonlinear narrative 
Cinema can only provide the illusion through broken narrative, a famous example of this being the 1994 film Pulp Fiction. The film is ostensibly three short stories, which, upon closer inspection, are actually three sections of one story with the chronology broken up; Quentin Tarantino constructs the narrative without resorting to classic "flashback" techniques.

An even more ambitious attempt at constructing a film based on non-linear narrative is Alain Resnais's 1993 French film Smoking/No Smoking. The plot contains parallel developments, playing on the idea of what might have happened had the characters made different choices.

Outside of film, some novels also present their narrative in a non-linear fashion. Creative writing professor Jane Alison describes nonlinear narrative "patterns" such as spirals, waves, and meanders in her 2019 book Meander, Spiral, Explode: Design and Pattern in Narrative. The chapters of Chitra Banerjee Divakaruni's novel Before We Visit the Goddess are not arranged based on the linear sequence of events, but rather in a way that fulfills certain literary techniques. This allows the characters in the novel to have a believable life timeline while still employing the techniques that make a story enjoyable.

Interactive narration 
In works of interactive narration there is only one narrative but the method of delivery requires the user to actively work to gain the next piece of the narrative, or have to piece the parts of narrative that they have together in order to form a coherent narrative.

This is the narrative approach of some modern video games. A player will be required to reach an objective, complete a task, solve a puzzle, or finish a level before the narrative continues.

Interactive narrative 
An interactive narrative is one which is composed with a branching structure where a single starting point may lead to multiple developments and outcomes. The principle of all such games is that, at each step of the narrative, the user makes choices that advance the story, leading to a new series of choices. Authoring non-linear narrative or dialogue thus implies imagining an indefinite number of parallel stories.

In a gamebook, readers are told to turn to a certain page according to the choice they wish to make to continue the story. Typically, the choice will be an action rather than dialogue. For example, the hero hears a noise in another room and must decide to open the door and investigate, run away, or call for help. This kind of interactive experience of a story is possible with video games and books (where the reader is free to turn the pages) but less adapted to other forms of entertainment. Improvisational theatre is similarly open-ended, but of course cannot be said to be authored.

Graphic narrative 
A simple graphic narrative, such as in comics, has four stages: an introduction of the characters and a description of a situation, the introduction of a problem, unexpected opportunity, or other complication into the situation, a resolution in the form of a partial or complete response to the problem by one or more of the characters, and the denouement, the aftermath of the response that makes clear the success, partial success, non-success, or uncertain success of the response. This fourth stage may also show how the original situation has changed due to what has taken place in the Complication and Resolution stages of the narrative.

In a simple narrative, the four stages appear in order. That is, the sequence of the telling or presentation follows the chronology of the told. In a more complex story, the order of the telling may vary. For instance, such a story may begin with the Denouement and then present the Situation, Complication, and Resolution in a flashback. But this is not the case with a simple narrative.

See also 
Dramatic structure
The Hero with a Thousand Faces
Narratology
Narreme as the basic unit of narrative structure
Non-narrative film
Rising action
Screenwriting
Suspense
The Writer's Journey: Mythic Structure for Writers

References 

Fiction
Literary theory
Narratology
Parts of the narrative structure